= Sad Alice Said =

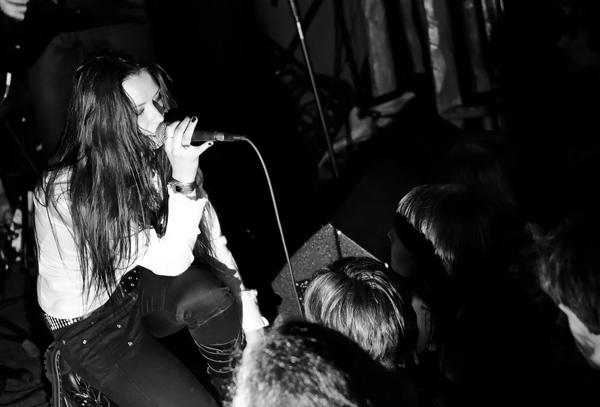
Sad Alice Said

Sad Alice Said, formerly known as Alice in Wonderland, is a gothic metal band from Ukraine.

== History ==
Sad Alice Said, also known simply as Alice, was created in 2005 by Alisa Levera Shakor and Yuliya (who left the band) in Zhytomyr, Ukraine. The name was taken from Alice in Wonderland. The theme of their lyrics are mainly; time, nature, feelings and philosophical questions.

Initially, the structure was intended to be only for female members, but with the inclusion of a second guitar, the idea of an all female band was left behind. Then they met Lykhotvor Pavlo, who would take the post of second guitar. The bass player Katia left and was replaced by Sergey Lykhotvor's brother Pavlo. In April 2006, during one of the trials, Yuliya Levera left Sad Alice Said. Then followed changes to keyboardists and drummers, but the core of the band was unchanged: Alisa, Pavlo and Serhiy. In 2007, they met Yuliya Balan (keyboards), and, after some trials, she joined the group. After some time, they decided to improve the sound of the band, and Anna Polozova became the violinist.

Sad Alice Said have released one album, Yesterday's Tomorrow, in 2013, one EP, Clock Of Eternity in 2011, and four singles. Their song, "Open Your Eyes", was nominated as 'Song for 2010' by the Unreliz Music Awards. Keyboard player, Julia Balan, was diagnosed with cancer in 2015, and is undergoing treatment into 2016; fundraising events are taking place in Zhytomyr to help pay for her operation in Israel.

== Members ==
- Alisa Shakor.
- Pavlo Lykhovor.
- Serhiy Lykhotvor.
- Yuliya Balan.
- Andiy Lavrusha.

== Discography ==
- 2011: Open Your Eyes (single).
- 2011: Clock Of Eternity (EP).
- 2012: Fade (single).
- 2012: Alive (single).
- 2013: Yesterday's Tomorrow (album)
- 2014: Stay (single).
